Etchinghill is a village in Kent, England, about 5 km north of Hythe, and 1 km north of the Channel Tunnel terminal at Cheriton, near Folkestone. It is in the civil parish of Lyminge.
The village has a standard golf course noted for its hills, as well as a pub restaurant called The New Inn  which claims to be the closest pub to the Channel Tunnel. Village facilities include a basketball court, two football goals, and a village hall. A large BT Group communication mast, which was used as a telecommunication relay during the Cold War, still stands in the village.

History
The hamlet of Etchinghill lies at the southern end of the Parish of Lyminge. Its original name was Tettinghelde 1240 (Tetta’s slope). A spring rises to the north side of Westfield Lane, (the road to Tolsford Hill) and the resultant stream flows across the fields to join up with the Nailbourne that rises in Well Field, Lyminge. This stream is known as the East Brook and probably in the Saxon period, when the settlement got its name of Tetinghelde, the volume of water would have been much greater. By the 15th Century the hamlet’s name had altered to “Etynghyld” and “Etynghyll”. Later known as Eachendhill or Etchinghole before settling to become Etchinghill. For centuries the hamlet remained a small farming community around the cross-roads, one of which led to Dover; one going south to Hythe and north to the village of Lyminge where the church is; the track up Westfield Lane over Tolsford Hill led people to West Hythe no doubt, but the importance of this waned as the coastline altered; and a final lane (now vanished) led to Newington.

Over the years the hamlet has grown with additional development on all four of the roads leading from the crossroads, the establishment of a cricket club and, more recently, the creation of a golf course spreading across the land which separates Etchinghill from Lyminge.

Railway
To the North-East of the Village are the remains of the Elham Valley Railway, characterised by steep-sided cuttings and tunnels. The line which ran from Canterbury to the port of Folkestone, was closed in 1947 and dismantled between 1950 and 1954. 
The line is crossed by Teddars Leas Road (bridge) and Badger's Bridge as well as the Golf Course.
Although there was no station in Etchinghill, villagers could catch the train by travelling to the neighbouring village of Lyminge, approximately 2 miles to the North via road or one of the many public footpaths.

Boche Buster

During the war, Etchinghill was home to the Boche Buster, a large rail-mounted gun which could be retracted into one of the many tunnels to provide cover from aerial photography and German bombing raids, and which gained a certain notoriety owing to its large size (there were other large rail-mounted guns in service, but none of 18 inch bore).

The Elham Valley Railway was requisitioned during the war as a military railway. With a range of around 12 miles, the gun was designed to attack invading German forces whilst still in mid-channel. Some sources still claim that the Boche Buster had a range of over 30 miles and could fire across the channel into German-occupied France. This was not the case, although it shared a considerable amount of history with a set of 13.5 inch railway guns also stationed in Kent, which were capable of firing into German-occupied France. The gun's location and operation were considered secret, and it was initially transported to Kent disguised (by camouflage) as a banana freight train.

St Mary's Hospital
Until the early 1990s, the village was dominated by St Mary's Hospital. This was constructed in 1836 by the Elham Poor Law Union as the workhouse for the surrounding area, including the towns of Folkestone and Hythe. Prior to this each parish had relieved the poor the best way they could, usually by allowing them to remain in their own homes and giving them outdoor relief, although Elham and Newington each had a small local workhouse facility. In 1834 Parliament passed the Poor Law Amendment Act and suggested parishes might group together and provide cross-community facilities. This led to the foundation of the Elham Poor Law Union in 1835, and the building of the workhouse at Etchinghill in 1836 at a cost of £6,500.

Designed by architect Sir Francis Head, the workhouse was designed to accommodate 300 inmates. In 1841 an additional building had been erected to provide food and temporary accommodation to some of the many vagrants who wandered the countryside. Despite its large size, it was considerably extended in 1890, with the addition of new dormitory wards, an infirmary, and a chapel.

Following the closure of the workhouse in 1947, the buildings passed to the National Health Service, and were re-opened as St Mary's Hospital, specialising in geriatric care. There was also a hospital annexe providing isolation facilities for patients with highly infectious diseases. The hospital was helped by community volunteers who included hospital visitors (who befriended patients), the local St. John Ambulance (who provided qualified auxiliary nurses for routine nursing and bed making duties throughout the 1980s), and a very active League of Friends (who raised money to provide many additional comforts for the residents), active from 1962 until the hospital's closure.

St Mary’s hospital was closed in 1990 and all the buildings, with the exception of the un-consecrated chapel, were demolished. 52 houses now occupy approximately two thirds of the land, with a new village hall and amenity land for all to enjoy taking up the remainder of the land. The hospital chapel, the last remaining physical element, has been converted into a private house.

References

External links

 Etchinghill village web site

Villages in Kent